How the Grinch Stole Christmas! is a Christmas children's story by Theodor "Dr. Seuss" Geisel written in rhymed verse with illustrations by the author. It follows the Grinch, a grouchy, solitary creature who attempts to thwart the public's Christmas plans by stealing Christmas gifts and decorations from the homes of the nearby town of Whoville on Christmas Eve. Miraculously, the Grinch realizes that Christmas is not all about money and presents.

The story was published as a book by Random House in 1957, and at approximately the same time in an issue of Redbook. The book criticizes the commercialization of Christmas and the holiday season.

The book has been adapted many times, first as a 1966 animated TV film narrated by Boris Karloff, who also provided the Grinch's voice. In 1977, a Halloween prequel, Halloween Is Grinch Night, aired with the Grinch voiced by Hans Conried. These were followed with a 2000 live-action feature film starring Jim Carrey, a 2007 musical, a 2018 computer-animated film starring Benedict Cumberbatch, a 2020 live television adaptation of the musical starring Matthew Morrison, and an unauthorized 2022 slasher horror parody film starring David Howard Thornton.

Plot

The Grinch is a grouchy, solitary creature with a heart "two sizes too small". He resides in a cave on a mountain north of Whoville, home of the cheerful and warmhearted Whos. Having been annoyed by Whoville's noisy Christmas festivities for fifty-three years, the Grinch resolves to stop Christmas from coming. He disguises himself as Santa Claus and travels to Whoville on a sleigh pulled by his dog, Max. The Grinch slides down the chimney of the first house on the square and steals all the presents, the food for the feast, and the Christmas tree. He is briefly interrupted by Cindy Lou Who, a young Who girl, but concocts a crafty lie to get rid of her so that he can escape. 

After doing the same to the other Who houses, the Grinch takes his sleigh to the top of Mount Crumpit and prepares to dump all of the stolen belongings into the abyss. As dawn breaks, he expects to hear the Whos crying, but is shocked to hear them singing a joyous Christmas song instead. After much thought, the Grinch comes to realize that Christmas "means a little bit more" than just presents and feasting, causing his shrunken heart to grow three sizes larger. The reformed Grinch returns the Whos' presents and food and is asked to take part in their Christmas feast.

Background and publication history

The Grinch first appeared in a 33-line illustrated poem by Dr. Seuss called "The Hoobub and the Grinch", which was originally published in the May 1955 edition of Redbook magazine. Dr. Seuss began work on How the Grinch Stole Christmas! a couple of years later, around the beginning of 1957. He had recently completed The Cat in the Hat and was in the midst of founding Beginner Books with Phyllis and Bennett Cerf and his wife, Helen Palmer Geisel. Helen, who had ongoing medical problems and had suffered a small stroke in April 1957, nevertheless acted as an unofficial editor, as she had with previous Dr. Seuss books. 

Dr. Seuss claimed he was the inspiration for the character, as his wife's health problems and his dismay with the commercialization of Christmas made him feel "very Grinchish" as he looked in the mirror one year on December 26. 

Dr. Seuss wrote the book quickly and was mostly finished with it within a few weeks. Biographers Judith and Neil Morgan wrote that it was the easiest book of his career to write, except for its conclusion. According to Dr. Seuss:

I got hung up getting the Grinch out of the mess. I got into a situation where I sounded like a second-rate preacher or some biblical truism... Finally in desperation... without making any statement whatever, I showed the Grinch and the Whos together at the table, and made a pun of the Grinch carving the 'roast beast'. ... I had gone through thousands of religious choices, and then after three months it came out like that.

By mid-May 1957, the book was finished and in the mail to the Random House offices in New York. In June, Dr. Seuss and Helen took a month-long vacation to Hawaii, where he checked and returned the book's galley proof. The book debuted in December, in both a book version published by Random House and in an issue of Redbook. Dr. Seuss dedicated the book to Theodor "Teddy" Owens, the one-year-old son of his niece, Peggy Owens.

As of 2005, the book had been translated into nine languages, including Latin as Quomodo Invidiosulus Nomine Grinchus Christi Natalem Abrogaverit. The translation was published in October 1998 by Bolchazy-Carducci Publishers Inc.

Reception
M. S. Libby, writing in the New York Herald Tribune, compared the book favorably to Dr. Seuss's earlier works: "His peculiar and original genius in line and word is always the same, yet, so rich are the variations he plays on his themes, always fresh and amusing." Kirkus Reviews wrote, "Youngsters will be in transports over the goofy gaiety of Dr. Seuss's first book about a villain." The reviewer called the Grinch "easily the best Christmas-cad since Scrooge." Ellen Lewis Buell, in her review in The New York Times, praised the book's handling of its moral, as well as its illustrations and verse. She wrote:

Even if you prefer Dr. Seuss in a purely antic mood, you must admit that if there's a moral to be pointed out, no one can do it more gaily. The reader is swept along by the ebullient rhymes and the weirdly zany pictures until he is limp with relief when the Grinch reforms and, like the latter, mellow with good feelings.

The review for The Saturday Review of Literature stated: "The inimitable Dr. Seuss has brought off a fresh triumph in his new picture book... The verse is as lively and the pages are as bright and colorful as anyone could wish." The reviewer suggested that parents and older siblings reading the book to young children would also enjoy its moral and humor. Charlotte Jackson of the San Francisco Chronicle called the book "wonderful fantasy, in the true Dr. Seuss manner, with pictures in the Christmas colors."

Analysis
Some writers, including Dr. Seuss, have made a connection between the Grinch and Dr. Seuss. In the story, the Grinch laments that he has had to put up with the Whos' celebration of Christmas for 53 years. As both Thomas Fensch and Charles Cohen note, Dr. Seuss was 53 when he wrote and published the book. Dr. Seuss asserted the connection in an article in the December 1957 edition of Redbook: "I was brushing my teeth on the morning of the 26th of last December when I noticed a very Grinch-ish countenance in the mirror. It was Seuss! So I wrote about my sour friend, the Grinch, to see if I could rediscover something about Christmas that obviously I'd lost." Seuss's step-daughter, Lark Dimond-Cates, stated in a speech in 2003, "I always thought the Cat... was Ted on his good days, and the Grinch was Ted on his bad days." Cohen notes that Seuss drove a car with a license plate that read "GRINCH".

Thomas Fensch notes that the Grinch is the first adult and the first villain to be a main character in a Dr. Seuss book.

Adaptations
The book has been adapted into a variety of media, including stage and film. Chuck Jones and Ben Washam adapted the story as an animated television special in 1966, featuring narration by Boris Karloff, who also provided the Grinch's voice. Thurl Ravenscroft sang "You're A Mean One, Mr. Grinch", with lyrics written by Dr. Seuss himself. A prequel called Halloween Is Grinch Night aired on ABC on October 28, 1977. Hans Conried was the voice of the Grinch and the Narrator because Boris Karloff had died in 1969. A crossover special called The Grinch Grinches the Cat in the Hat aired on ABC on May 20, 1982. In 2000, the book was adapted into a live-action film, directed by Ron Howard and starring Jim Carrey as the Grinch. Illumination Entertainment also developed a 3D animated feature film, titled The Grinch directed by Yarrow Cheney and Scott Mosier and starring Benedict Cumberbatch as the Grinch. It was originally scheduled to be released on November 10, 2017, but was pushed back to November 9, 2018. In 2022, the book was adapted into a horror film, directed by Steven LaMorte and starring David Howard Thornton as the Grinch.

Several audio recordings and audio-visual adaptations of the book have also been published. In 1975, Zero Mostel narrated an LP record of the story. In 1992, Random House Home Video released an updated animated version of the book narrated by Walter Matthau, also including the story, If I Ran The Zoo. In 2009, an interactive e-book version was released for the iPhone. In 2000, Rik Mayall read the book as one of four of Seuss's books on the audio CD The Dr Seuss Collection.

A musical stage version was produced by the Old Globe Theatre, San Diego in 2007. It also was produced on Broadway and a limited-engagement US tour in 2008. The North American Tour began in the fall of 2010 and has subsequently toured every fall since. The book was adapted into a 13-minute song, performed by the Boston Pops Orchestra, arranged by Danny Troob, and featuring bassist Reid Burton and actor Will LeBow narrating it on the Boston Pops's 2013 CD, "A Boston Pops Christmas – Live from Symphony Hall with Keith Lockhart".

Legacy
Based on a 2007 online poll, the National Education Association listed the book as one of its "Teachers' Top 100 Books for Children". In 2012 it was ranked 61st among the "Top 100 Picture Books" in a survey published by School Library Journal – the fourth of five Dr. Seuss books on the list.

The book's main characters have made appearances in other works. The Grinch appears in the animated specials Halloween Is Grinch Night and The Grinch Grinches the Cat in the Hat. Max, the Grinch's dog, and the Grinch himself also appear in the children's puppet show The Wubbulous World of Dr. Seuss. The Grinch, Cindy Lou Who, and Max, appear in Seussical, a musical which takes its plot from several Dr. Seuss books.

Since the book was written, the word "grinch" has entered the popular lexicon as an informal noun, defined as a "killjoy" or a "spoilsport".

Sequel
A sequel, titled How the Grinch Lost Christmas!, is scheduled for release on September 5, 2023. It will be published by Random House Children's Books. The book was written by Alastair Heim and illustrated by Aristides Ruiz.

See also
 List of Christmas-themed literature

Notes

Sources

External links
 Grinch at Don Markstein's Toonopedia. Archived from the original on February 5, 2016.

1957 children's books
Children's books adapted into films
Books by Dr. Seuss
Christmas children's books
The Grinch (franchise)
Random House books
Works originally published in Redbook
Criticism of the commercialization of Christmas